Terry Smith may refer to:

Entertainment
 Terry Smith (guitarist) (born 1943), British jazz guitarist
 Terry Smith (art historian) (born 1944), Australian art historian and critic
 Terry Smith (artist) (born 1956), English sculptor
 Terry Smith (dancer), with English troupe Diversity

Sports
 Terry Smith (Australian footballer) (1959–2006), player with St Kilda and Richmond
 Terry Smith (footballer, born 1951), English football player for Stoke City
 Terry Smith (ice hockey) (born 1956), Canadian/American ice hockey player
 Terry Smith (American football, born 1959), American pro football player, head coach, owner
 Terry Smith (American football, born 1969), American college football coach and player
 Terry Smith (basketball) (born 1986), American basketball player
 Terry Smith (footballer, born 1987), English football goalkeeper

Other
 Terry Smith (politician) (born 1946), Australian politician
 Terry Smith (businessman) (born 1953), British fund manager
 Terry Smith (sportscaster) (fl. 2000s), radio

See also
Terence Smith (disambiguation)
Smith (surname)